Indong Jang clan is one of the Korean clans. Their Bon-gwan is in Gumi, North Gyeongsang Province. According to the research in 2000, the number of Indong Jang clan was 591315.

References

External links 
 

Indong Jang clan